Adam Keighran (born 24 April 1997) is an Australian professional rugby league footballer who plays as a  or  for the Catalans Dragons in the Betfred Super League. 

He previously played for the New Zealand Warriors and the Sydney Roosters in the NRL.

Background
Keighran was born in Sydney, Australia.

He played his junior rugby league for the Wyong Roos before being signed by the Canterbury-Bankstown Bulldogs.

Career

2018
Keighran signed a two-year deal in 2017 with the Penrith Panthers, kicking 80 goals for their New South Wales Cup side in 2018 and was picked as one of two Centres of the year despite playing the last 10 games of his season in the halves. In October 2018 he signed a three-year deal with the New Zealand Warriors.

2019
Keighran made his first grade debut in round 1 of the 2019 NRL season playing for the Warriors against the Canterbury-Bankstown Bulldogs, scoring a try in their 40–6 win.

2020
In November 2020, he signed a two-year deal to join the Sydney Roosters starting in 2021.

2021
In round 1 of the 2021 NRL season, he made his debut for the Sydney Roosters in their 46-4 victory over Manly-Warringah at the Sydney Cricket Ground.
In round 25 of the 2021 NRL season, he scored a hat-trick for the Sydney Roosters in a 40-16 victory over Canberra.
He played a total of 15 games for the Sydney Roosters in the 2021 NRL season including the club's two finals matches.  The Sydney Roosters would be eliminated from the second week of the finals losing to Manly 42-6.

2022
Keighran only featured in two matches for the Sydney Roosters throughout the 2022 NRL season. Keighran spent the rest of the year playing for the clubs NSW Cup team North Sydney.

2023
On 23 November 2022, Keighran signed a contract to join Super League side the Catalans Dragons ahead of the 2023 Super League season. Keighran made his club debut for Catalans in their round 1 victory over Wakefield Trinity kicking five goals.

Personal life
Son of Shane and Melissa Keighran and younger brother of Brad Keighran who is also known in the football world for his own athletic achievements.
On April 21, 2021 Adam welcomed his first born child, Koa Bradley Keighran to his partner Taylee Wall.

References

External links
Warriors profile

1997 births
Living people
Australian rugby league players
Catalans Dragons players
New Zealand Warriors players
Rugby league five-eighths
Rugby league players from Sydney
Sydney Roosters players